John Bartholomew (1831–1893) was the second in a line of Scottish cartographers which included:
John Bartholomew Sr. (1805–1861), father of John
John George Bartholomew (1860–1920), son of John
John (Ian) Bartholomew (1890–1962), son of John George
John Christopher Bartholomew (1923–2008), son of Ian

John Bartholomew may also refer to:
John Bartholomew (priest) ( 1847–1865), Archdeacon of Barnstaple
John Bartholomew Gough (1817–1886), American temperance orator
John Bartholomew (Australian politician) (1858–1928), Queensland parliamentarian
John Eric Bartholomew (1926–1984), English comedian known by his stage name Eric Morecambe
John Logan Bartholomew (born 1984), American film and television actor
John Bartholomew (chess player) (born 1986), American chess player
John B. Bartholomew (1916–1983), American journalist and radio and television broadcaster
John Bartholomew (Vermont politician)

See also
Collins Bartholomew (formerly "John Bartholomew and Son Ltd."), map publishers established by John Senior and John